The following is a list of 73 individuals killed at the Indianapolis Motor Speedway: 42 drivers, one motorcyclist, 13 riding mechanics, and 17 others including a pit crew member, track personnel, and spectators.  All fatalities are related to Championship Car races at the speedway unless otherwise noted.

58 of the 73 fatalities occurred as part of the Indianapolis 500 (including the race, qualifying, and practice).  Fatalities have also occurred in conjunction with the precursors to the 500 (which took place in 1909 and 1910), the Brickyard 400, Moto GP event, the Speedway's golf course, and during private testing.  During World War I, while the speedway was being used as a landing strip and a maintenance and refueling station for the 821st Aero Repair Squadron, at least one test pilot was fatally injured in a plane crash at the track.

See also 
List of IndyCar fatalities
Driver deaths in motorsport

References 

Lists of motorsport fatalities at race tracks in the United States
Indianapolis 500-related lists